African American Review (AAR) is a scholarly aggregation of essays on African-American literature, theatre, film, the visual arts, and culture; interviews; poetry; fiction; and book reviews.

The journal has featured writers and cultural critics including Trudier Harris, Arnold Rampersad, Hortense Spillers, Amiri Baraka, Cyrus Cassells, Rita Dove, Charles Johnson, Cheryl Wall, and Toni Morrison. It is the official publication of the Modern Language Association's LLC African American. Between 1967 and 1976, the journal appeared under the title Negro American Literature Forum and until 1992 as Black American Literature Forum before obtaining its current title. It is based in St. Louis.

AAR has received three American Literary Magazine Awards for Editorial Content, and grants from the National Endowment for the Arts, the Lila Wallace-Reader's Digest Fund, the Kennedy Center for the Performing Arts, and the Council of Literary Magazines and Presses.

References

External links
 
 Johns Hopkins University Press journal page
 Project MUSE
 JSTOR

1967 establishments in Missouri
Black studies publications
Area studies journals
English-language journals
Johns Hopkins University Press academic journals
Publications established in 1967
Quarterly journals